Renzo Chiocchetti (17 November 1945 – 13 February 2020) was an Italian cross-country skier. He competed at the 1972 Winter Olympics and the 1976 Winter Olympics. He was a member of the Ladin ethnic group.

References

External links
 

1945 births
2020 deaths
Italian male cross-country skiers
Olympic cross-country skiers of Italy
Cross-country skiers at the 1972 Winter Olympics
Cross-country skiers at the 1976 Winter Olympics
Sportspeople from Trentino
Ladin people